Jakub Herm-Záhlava (born 12 May 1980) is a former professional tennis player from Germany. Born in Plzeň, Czechoslovakia, he is a cousin of Czech tennis player Sandra Záhlavová.

Biography
Záhlava played in the main draw of two ATP Tour level tournaments, Bucharest in 2000 and Stuttgart in 2001. He won the 2002 Wolfsburg Challenger tournament. Playing as a qualifier, he upset second seed Jürgen Melzer en route to the title win. During his career he also had wins over Marin Čilić, Ivo Karlović, Philipp Kohlschreiber and Janko Tipsarević. He played tennis in the German Bundesliga for Mannheim.

As a coach he has worked full-time with Michael Berrer, Louk Sorensen and Tatjana Maria. One of the players that he has coached, Barbora Strýcová, was also his wife from 2006 to 2015. He now coaches at the Schüttler Waske Tennis-University near Frankfurt am Main in Germany.

Challenger titles

Singles: (1)

References

External links
 
 

1980 births
Living people
German male tennis players
German tennis coaches
Czech emigrants to Germany
Sportspeople from Plzeň